Talbot v. Janson, 3 U.S. (3 Dall.) 133 (1795), was a case in which the Supreme Court of the United States held that the jurisdiction of the court extended to the seas and that a citizen of the United States could also hold the citizenship of another polity (in the case of Talbot, being a citizen of France).  This holding means that multiple citizenship may be held by Americans.

See also
Multiple citizenship

References

External links
 

United States Supreme Court cases
1795 in United States case law
United States Citizenship Clause case law
United States Supreme Court cases of the Rutledge Court